Davinia Taylor (born Davinia Murphy; 11 November 1977) is an English actress, socialite and interior designer, best known for playing Jude Cunningham in the soap opera Hollyoaks.

Career
Taylor starred in Channel 4 soap opera Hollyoaks, playing party girl Jude Cunningham from 1996 to 1998.

The original Hollyoaks part led to roles in the television movies Bostock's Cup, Is Harry on the Boat?, the comedic film, Soul Patrol, as well as a spot on an episode of Urban Gothic, presenting work on The Big Breakfast and Top of the Pops @ Play and an appearance in the documentary series Young, Hot and Talented for Channel 5.

Taylor opened her own hair and beauty salon 'Taylor Made' in London in March 2011.

In 2016 Taylor returned to Hollyoaks after an 18-year absence.

Personal life
Taylor's father, Alan Murphy, a multi-millionaire, ran the AM Paper toilet roll factory in Skelmersdale.

Taylor has frequently been featured in the British tabloid press, as part of the Primrose Hill set with Sadie Frost (actress and ex-wife of Jude Law), and supermodel Kate Moss.

References

External links 
 

English television actresses
English soap opera actresses
People from Wigan
People educated at Bolton School
People educated at Rossall School
1977 births
Living people
20th-century English actresses
21st-century English actresses